The Belgian National Sports Merit Award is an annual award handed out to a Belgian sportsperson or -team for exceptional merit. Players can only win the award once during their career, making this trophy one of the most prestigious in Belgian sports. The trophy is awarded by a jury consisting of (former) sports champions (e.g. Paul Van Himst and Ingrid Berghmans), influential sports people and sports journalists and is led by the mayor of Brussels.

The trophy was established in 1928 by Alban Collignon, as a tribute to the founder of the Royal Belgian Aero-club, Fernand Jacobs. Therefore the trophy was in the first four years known as the Fernand Jacobs Award.

Winners

See also
Belgian Sportsman of the year
Belgian Sports Personality of the Year

References 

National sportsperson-of-the-year trophies and awards
Belgian sports trophies and awards
Awards established in 1928
1928 establishments in Belgium